Quizzing the News was an American game show which aired on ABC between August 11, 1948, and March 5, 1949, at 8:00 PM on Monday nights.

Premise 
Three panelists had to identify events in the news based on spoken clues and drawings. Master of ceremonies Alan Prescott provided the words, and cartoonist Albee Tribler created the sketches, Panelists included Arthur Q. Bryan, Milton Caniff, Mary Hunter, Ray Joseph, Mary Wickes, Robert Garland, Hope Emerson, and Joan Lloyd.

People viewing the program on TV also had an opportunity to take part and win prizes.

Production
The series was produced by Robert Brenner Productions, with Brenner as the producer, Tom DeHuff was the director, and Milton Subotsky was the writer. After initially originating from an independent station with ABC production personnel in charge, it began originating from WJZ-TV after that station went on the air.

Reception 
A review of the September 6, 1948, episode in the trade publication Billboard found that the program had potential but, "there's too much gab and too little action". Reviewer Jerry Franken suggested that the show would be better suited to a 15-minute slot.

Episode status
The series appears to have been wiped, as was the custom of the networks at the time.

See also
1948-49 United States network television schedule

References

External links
 
1948 American television series debuts
1949 American television series endings
American Broadcasting Company original programming
1940s American game shows
American panel games
Black-and-white American television shows
English-language television shows
Lost television shows